Kendié or Kenndié (Kènjé) is a village and rural commune in the Cercle of Bandiagara of the Mopti Region of Mali. The commune contains 34 villages and had a population of 24,359 in the 2009 census.

Kendié is a large regional village with a Wednesday weekly market. It is located on a high location on a plateau, not far from valleys.

References

External links
.
. Includes map of commune.

Communes of Mopti Region